Cheqollo (Quechua for nightingale) is an archaeological site in Peru. It is located in the Cusco Region, Cusco Province, San Jerónimo District, north of San Jerónimo. The site was declared a National Cultural Heritage (Patrimonio Cultural) by Resolucion Directorial Nacional No. 514/ 2003.

See also 
 Pachatusan
 Wanakawri
 Waqutu

References

Archaeological sites in Cusco Region
Archaeological sites in Peru